The  is a park with botanical garden located at Higashi Suma 1-1, Suma-ku, Kobe, Hyōgo, Japan. It is open daily except Thursdays; an admission fee is charged.

The park was created in 1967 on the general model of the Palace of Versailles park. It includes about 230 types of trees, substantial gardens of iris (40 varieties), rose (160 varieties), and camellia, as well as a botanical garden with greenhouse, collections of hydrangea, peony, and cherry trees (20 varieties), a Japanese garden, tea ceremony rooms, a drive lined with maple trees, etc. The park also includes fountains, a picnic area and restaurant, playground, and an athletic pathway with 28 stations.

See also 

 List of botanical gardens in Japan

References 
 Suma Rikyu Park (Japanese)
 Jardins Botaniques Japonais (French)
 Feel Kobe entry
 Japanican entry

Geography of Kobe
Parks and gardens in Hyōgo Prefecture
Botanical gardens in Japan
Greenhouses in Japan
Tourist attractions in Kobe